Efe Çakarel is a Turkish entrepreneur, founder and CEO of MUBI. Following his graduation from the American Collegiate Institute in İzmir, Turkey, he earned his B.S. in Electrical Engineering and Computer Science from Massachusetts Institute of Technology, and an MBA from Stanford Graduate School of Business. Prior to founding MUBI, he spent a number of years at Goldman Sachs in investment banking. He was part of Turkey's national math team and placed third in the European Math Olympiad. He also has two patents related to monetization of web applications.

References

External links
 Film Comment article on founder Efe Cakarel
 Wired UK article on founder Efe Cakarel
 Talk given by Efe Cakarel at LeWeb London 2012
 Interview on Bloomberg TV’s 'The Pulse' (January 2016)
 Roundtable interview on CNBC's Morning News (January 2016)

20th-century births
Living people
MIT School of Engineering alumni
Stanford Graduate School of Business alumni
Turkish chief executives
Year of birth missing (living people)